CADgene is a database of genes involved in coronary artery disease (CAD) .

See also
 Coronary artery disease

References

External links
 https://web.archive.org/web/20110318214117/http://www.bioguo.org/CADgene/

Biological databases
Cardiovascular diseases